Statistics of Belgian First Division in the 1972–73 season for association football clubs in Belgium.

Overview

It was contested by 16 teams, and Club Brugge K.V. won the championship.

League standings

Results

References

Belgian Pro League seasons
Belgian
1972–73 in Belgian football